Natalie Gelman (born July 17, 1985) is an American folk-pop singer and songwriter. Gelman is mainly known for her strong vocals, and has released four albums. She regularly tours southern California and other parts of the United States, performing at various venues and festivals. She has opened for Bon Jovi and played at Carnegie Hall.

Early life
Gelman was born and raised in New York City. Her parents are both musicians: father a violinist and her mother a pianist. Gelman would often try to get attention by singing along to Disney films, and performing for her parents and three siblings at dinner. They both encouraged her musical aspirations with classical training. She wrote her first song when she was 11 years old, and picked up the guitar in high school. She attended LaGuardia High School of Music & Art and ultimately ended her education by graduating from the University of Miami in 2006 with a Bachelor of Music.

Musical career
She started seriously performing at the age of 17, eventually busking on New York City Subway platforms. In 2006, after the release of her self-titled album, she started a  tour from Miami to New York City on rollerblades to promote the album and support Children International. The trip took 48 days. After multiple attempts, she was ultimately accepted into the MTA's Music Under New York program.

She released her first self-titled LP in 2006. Her second album, an EP, produced by Charlie Midnight and Mark Needham, was released in 2013. The music video for the song "Most the While" was selected for the 2014 New Media Film Festival.

Gelman began a month-long tour with Alyse Black on July 16, 2014 through Washington state, Oregon and Montana.

On July 17, 2014 she started a crowdfunding campaign to fund a full-length LP.

On February 28, 2017 Natalie was chosen to open for Bon Jovi at the Golden 1 Center in Sacramento, California as part of his This House Is Not for Sale Tour.

In 2020, she was selected to play at the Folk Alliance International in New Orleans.

Personal life
Though she has lived a significant amount of time in New York, Gelman settled in Ojai, California in 2012. There she met Brent Florence, and after a courtship, they were married on October 14, 2016.

Discography

Natalie Gelman

Streetlamp Musician
Gelman's second album was released in 2013.

References

External links

1985 births
21st-century American writers
21st-century American women writers
American women singer-songwriters
Philanthropists from New York (state)
American pop guitarists
Living people
Singers from New York City
University of Miami Frost School of Music alumni
21st-century American women guitarists
21st-century American guitarists
Fiorello H. LaGuardia High School alumni
Guitarists from New York City
21st-century American women singers
21st-century American singers
Singer-songwriters from New York (state)